Stefan Čolović may refer to:
Stefan Čolović (Serbian footballer) (born 1994), Serbian football midfielder
Stefan Čolović (Swiss footballer) (born 1994), Swiss football defender